Grameen Bank is a microfinance organisation and community development bank founded in Bangladesh. It makes small loans (known as microcredit or "grameencredit") to the impoverished without requiring collateral.

Grameen Bank originated in 1976, in the work of Professor Muhammad Yunus at University of Chittagong, who launched a research project to study how to design a credit delivery system to provide banking services to the rural poor. In October 1983 the Grameen Bank was authorised by national legislation to operate as an independent bank.

The bank grew significantly between 2003 and 2007. As of January 2011, the total borrowers of the bank number 8.4 million, and 97% of those are women. In 1998 the Bank's "Low-cost Housing Program" won a World Habitat Award. In 2006, the bank and its founder, Muhammad Yunus, were jointly awarded the Nobel Peace Prize.

History 
Muhammad Yunus was inspired during the Bangladesh famine of 1974 to make a small loan of US$27 to a group of 42 families as start-up money so that they could make items for sale, without the burdens of high interest under predatory lending. Yunus believed that making such loans available to a larger population could stimulate businesses and reduce the widespread rural poverty in Bangladesh.

Yunus developed the principles of the Grameen Bank from his research and experience. Grameen Bank is Bengali for "Rural" or "Village" Bank. He began a research project, together with a national commercial bank and the University of Chittagong, extending microcredit to test his method for providing credit and banking services to the rural poor. In 1976, the village of Jobra became the first to be served by the project. Over the next two years, the project expanded to other villages in the area. The project, with support from the Bangladesh Bank, was extended in 1979 to the Tangail District (to the north of the capital, Dhaka). The project's services expanded to other districts of Bangladesh over the next few years.

By an ordinance of the Bangladesh government dated 2 October 1983, the project was converted into the Grameen Bank. Bankers Ron Grzywinski and Mary Houghton of ShoreBank, a community development bank in Chicago, helped Yunus with the official incorporation of the bank under a grant from the Ford Foundation. The bank's repayment rate suffered from the economic disruption following the 1998 flood in Bangladesh, but it recovered in the subsequent years. By the beginning of 2005, the bank had loaned over US$4.7 billion and by the end of 2008, US$7.6 billion to the poor.

In 2011, the Bangladesh government forced Yunus to resign from Grameen Bank, saying that at age 72, he was years beyond the legal limit for the position.

As of 2017, the Bank had about 2,600 branches and nine million borrowers, with a repayment rate of 99.6%. 97% of the borrowers were women. The Bank has been active in 97% of the villages of Bangladesh. Its success has inspired similar projects in more than 64 countries around the world, including a World Bank initiative to finance Grameen-type schemes.

Grameen Bank is now expanding into wealthy countries as well. As of 2017, Grameen America had 19 branches in eleven US cities. Its nearly 100,000 borrowers were all women.

Funding

"The bank has gained its funding from different sources, and the main contributors have shifted over time." In the initial years, donor agencies used to provide the bulk of capital at low rates. By the mid-1990s, the bank started to get most of its funding from the central bank of Bangladesh. More recently, Grameen has started bond sales as a source of finance. The bonds are implicitly subsidised, as they are guaranteed by the Government of Bangladesh, and still they are sold above the bank rate. In 2013, Bangladesh parliament passed 'Grameen Bank Act' which replaces the Grameen Bank Ordinance, 1983, authorising the government to make rules for any aspect of the running of the bank.

Application of microcredit 
Grameen Bank is founded on the principle that loans are better than charity to interrupt poverty: they offer people the opportunity to take initiatives in business or agriculture, which provide earnings and enable them to pay off the debt.

The bank is founded on the belief that people have endless potential, and unleashing their creativity and initiative helps them end poverty.
Grameen has offered credit to classes of people formerly underserved: the poor, women, illiterate, and unemployed people. Access to credit is based on reasonable terms, such as the group lending system and weekly-instalment payments, with reasonably long terms of loans, enabling the poor to build on their existing skills to earn better income in each cycle of loans.

Grameen's objective has been to promote financial independence among the poor. Yunus encourages all borrowers to become savers, so that their local capital can be converted into new loans to others. Since 1995, Grameen has funded 90 percent of its loans with interest income and deposits collected, aligning the interests of its new borrowers and depositor-shareholders. Grameen converts deposits made in villages into loans for the more needy in the villages (Yunus and Jolis 1998).

It targets the poorest of the poor, with a particular emphasis on women, who receive 95 percent of the bank's loans. Women traditionally had less access to financial alternatives of ordinary credit lines and incomes. They were seen to have an inequitable share of power in household decision making. Yunus and others have found that lending to women generates considerable secondary effects, including empowerment of a marginalised segment of society (Yunus and Jolis 1998), who share betterment of income with their children, unlike many men. Yunus claims that in 2004, women still have difficulty getting loans; they comprise less than 1 percent of borrowers from commercial banks (Yunus 2004). The interest rates charged by microfinance institutes including Grameen Bank is high compared to that of traditional banks; Grameen's interest (reducing balance basis) on its main credit product is about 20%.

Grameen has diversified the types of loans it makes. It supports hand-powered wells and loans to support the enterprises of Grameen members' immediate relatives. It has found that seasonal agricultural loans and lease-to-own agreements for equipment and livestock help the poor establish better agriculture. The bank has set a new goal: to make each of its branch locations free of poverty, as defined by benchmarks such as having adequate food and access to clean water and latrines.

Grameen Bank is best known for its system of solidarity lending. The Bank also incorporates a set of values embodied in Bangladesh by the Sixteen Decisions. At every branch of Grameen Bank, the borrowers recite these Decisions and vow to follow them. As a result of the Sixteen Decisions, Grameen borrowers have been encouraged to adopt positive social habits. One such habit includes educating children by sending them to school. Since the Grameen Bank embraced the Sixteen Decisions, almost all Grameen borrowers have their school-age children enrolled in regular classes. This in turn helps bring about social change, and educate the next generation.

Solidarity lending is a cornerstone of microcredit, and the system is now used in more than 43 countries.  Repayment responsibility rests solely on the individual borrower. No formal joint liability exists, i.e. group members are not obliged to pay on behalf of a defaulting member. But, in practice the group members often contribute the defaulted amount with an intention to collect the money from the defaulted member at a later time. Such behaviour is encouraged because Grameen does not extend further credit to a group in which a member defaults.

No legal instrument (i.e. no written contract) is made between Grameen Bank and its borrowers; the system works based on trust. To supplement the lending, Grameen Bank requires the borrowing members to save very small amounts regularly in a number of funds, designated for emergency, the group, etc. These savings help serve as an insurance against contingencies.

In a country in which few women may take out loans from large commercial banks, Grameen has focused on women borrowers; 97% of its members are women. While a World Bank study has concluded that women's access to microcredit empowers them through greater access to resources and control over decision making, some other economists argue that the relationship between microcredit and women-empowerment is less straightforward.

In other areas, Grameen has had very high payback rates—over 98 percent. However, according to The Wall Street Journal, in 2001 a fifth of the bank's loans were more than a year overdue. Grameen says that more than half of its borrowers in Bangladesh (close to 50 million) have risen out of acute poverty thanks to their loan, as measured by such standards as having all children of school age in school, all household members eating three meals a day, a sanitary toilet, a rainproof house, clean drinking water, and the ability to repay a 300 taka-a-week (around US$4) loan.

The bank is also engaged in social business and entrepreneurship fields. In 2009, the Grameen Creative Lab collaborated with the Yunus Centre to create the Global Social Business Summit. The meeting has become the main platform for social businesses worldwide to foster discussions, actions and collaborations to develop effective solutions to the most pressing problems plaguing the world.

Village phone program
The bank has diversified among different applications of microcredit. In the Village Phone program, women entrepreneurs can start businesses to provide wireless payphone service in rural areas. This program earned the bank the 2004 Petersburg Prize worth EUR 100,000, for its contribution of Technology to Development. In the press release announcing the prize, the Development Gateway Foundation noted that through this program:

... Grameen has created a new class of women entrepreneurs who have raised themselves from poverty. Moreover, it has improved the livelihoods of farmers and others who are provided access to critical market information and lifeline communications previously unattainable in some 28,000 villages of Bangladesh. More than 55,000 phones are currently in operation, with more than 80 million people benefiting from access to market information, news from relatives, and more.

Struggling members program 
In 2003, Grameen Bank started a new program, different from its traditional group-based lending, exclusively targeted to the beggars in Bangladesh. This program is focused on distributing small loans to beggars.

Housing loans

In 1984, Grameen applied to the Central Bank for help setting up a housing loan program for its borrowers. Their application was rejected on the grounds that the $125 suggested loan could not possibly build a suitable living structure. So Grameen instead proposed the idea of "shelter loans". They were again rejected, this time on the grounds that their borrowers could not afford non-income generating loans. Grameen changed tactics and applied a third time, this time to make "factory loans", the explanation being that borrowers worked from home, so the home was also a factory that made it possible for borrowers to earn income. Grameen was rejected for a third time.

After this third rejection, Yunus, the bank's founder, met personally with the Central Bank governor to plead for their application. When asked if he thought the borrowers would repay the loans, he replied, "Yes, they will. They do. Unlike the rich, the poor cannot risk not repaying. This is the only chance they have." Grameen was then allowed to add housing loans to their range of services.

As of 1999, Grameen has made housing loans totalling $190 million to build over 560,000 homes with near-perfect repayment. By 1989, their average housing loan had grown to  $300. That year, the Grameen housing program received the Aga Khan International Award for Architecture.

Grameen Bank's perception of people with economic disadvantages 

When Muhammad Yunus took the first steps toward establishing Grameen Bank in Bangladesh and began to provide micro-credit loans to those living in abject poverty in the rural area surrounding Jobra

In his book Banker to the Poor: Micro-lending and the Battle Against World Poverty, Muhammad Yunus shows the outlook behind why Grameen Bank runs the way it does, saying, "When you hold the world in your palm and inspect it only from a birds eye view, you tend to become arrogant, you do not realize things become blurred when viewed from an enormous distance. I opted instead for the" worms eye view." …  The poor taught me an entirely new economics. I learned about the problems they face from their own perspective. " Here we see his willingness to immerse himself with the people he is aiming to help.   We get our first look at Muhammad Yunus's perception of the absolute poor when he meets Sufiya Begum, a bamboo stool maker who was trapped in poverty's vicious cycle due to a lack of 27 cents. That is where we find that what will become Grameen bank, is founded upon one man's heart for those that society and big corporations could or would not help.  Taking productive action, Yunus worked with the banks and community around to empower people like Sufiya to be able to apply for credit, and use it in the best and most productive way that she knows how in her unique situation.  Grameen Bank would need to be a bank of unusual standards. It would have to be, as Yunus put it, "an institution that would lend to those that had nothing. " Later, as time progressed, more situations would arise, such as battling for those who were landless, or small-time farmers such as those in Jobra who could not use a deep tube-well that was available to them.

As Grameen bank has developed and expanded in the years since its beginning, it continues to operate on those same two principles. Today, Grameen bank still assumes that when individuals are provided credit, they will be able to initiate upward social mobility for themselves through entrepreneurial endeavours. As a result, Grameen differs from many other social justice efforts in that it does not include intensive rehabilitation training programs for the disadvantaged persons it serves. Instead, Grameen gives its borrowers freedom to pursue a better future using the skills they already possess in the best way they can with membership in a five-person support group being the only requirement.

The Grameen Bank encourages its members to create a positive impact by becoming actively involved in the politics of their country. According to Muhammad Yunus's book, Banker to the Poor, Yunus commissioned his bank staff to encourage Grameen borrowers to vote; however, the staff were not to influence the voters' decisions on which political party to support. While all Grameen groups are required to exhibit a form of democracy (such as electing a chairperson and secretary), the Grameen staff were surprised to find that borrowers were thrilled with the opportunity to display their voting rights as citizens of Bangladesh in the 1991 national election. The work of the Grameen staff initiated a sharp increase in political activity which continued into the 1992, 1996, and 1997 elections. Since the Grameen Bank caters to women, the 1996 elections received more women voting than men, which led to the removal of political parties opposing women's rights. Not only did more women participate in political activism, but over 1,750 Grameen members, 268 male and 1,485 female, were elected to local offices in 1997.

In an interview with PBS in 2006, (after sixteen years of experience with Grameen Bank as a social business) Yunus expressed satisfaction in the micro-credit system of Grameen bank as a motivation and an opportunity for the poor to improve their own situations. He stressed that he has observed that Grameen's borrowers attain a sense of confidence and self-sufficiency when they pay back their loans from Grameen bank. While being careful not to criticise charity's rightful place, he added that the recipient of a charitable gift does not experience these long-term emotional benefits in the same way.

Operational statistics 
Grameen Bank is owned by the borrowers of the bank, most of whom are poor women. Of the total equity of the bank, the borrowers own 94%, and the remaining 6% is owned by the Bangladesh government.

The bank grew significantly between 2003 and 2007. As of January 2011, the total borrowers of the bank number 8.4 million, and 97% of those are women.
The number of borrowers has more than doubled since 2003, when the bank had 3.12 million members. Similar growth can be observed in the number of villages covered. As of October 2007, the Bank has a staff of more than 24,703 employees; its 2,468 branches provide services to 80,257 villages, up from the 43,681 villages covered in 2003.

The bank has distributed BDT 1.437 trillion (US$20.92 billion) in loans, out of which BDT 1.317 trillion (US$19.02 billion) has been repaid. The bank claims a loan recovery rate of 96.67%, up from the 95% recovery rate claimed in 1998. David Roodman has critiqued the accounting practices that Grameen used to determine this rate.

The global number of potential micro-borrowers is estimated to be 1 billion, with a total loan demand of $250 billion. The present microfinance model is serving 100 million people with $25 billion of loans. The Grameen Bank is 95% owned by the local poor and 5% by the government.

Staff training
The Grameen Bank staff often work in difficult conditions. Employees receive 6 months of on-the-job training while shadowing qualified and experienced individuals from various branches of Grameen. The goal of this training is for the trainee to "appreciate the unexplored potential of the destitute" and to discover new ways to solve problems that arise within the Grameen branch. After completing the 6-month period, trainees return to Dhaka headquarters for review and critique before appointment to a bank branch.

Honours
 1994, Grameen Bank received the Independence Day Award in 1994, which is the highest government award.
 13 October 2006, the Nobel Committee awarded Grameen Bank and its founder, Muhammad Yunus, the 2006 Nobel Peace Prize "for their efforts to create economic and social development from below." The award announcement also mentions that:
From modest beginnings three decades ago, Yunus has, first and foremost through Grameen Bank, developed micro-credit into an ever more important instrument in the struggle against poverty. Grameen Bank has been a source of ideas and models for the many institutions in the field of micro-credit that have sprung up around the world.

On 10 December 2006, Mosammat Taslima Begum, who used her first 16-euro (20-dollar) loan from the bank in 1992 to buy a goat and subsequently became a successful entrepreneur and one of the elected board members of the bank, accepted the Nobel Prize on behalf of Grameen Bank's investors and borrowers at the prize awarding ceremony held at Oslo City Hall.

Grameen Bank is the only business corporation to have won a Nobel Prize. Professor Ole Danbolt Mjøs, Chairman of the Norwegian Nobel Committee, in his speech said that, by giving the prize to Grameen Bank and Muhammad Yunus, the Norwegian Nobel Committee wanted to encourage attention on achievements of the Muslim world, on the women's perspective, and on the fight against poverty.

Citizens of Bangladesh celebrated the prize. Some critics said that the award affirms neoliberalism.

Related ventures 

The Grameen Bank has grown into over two dozen enterprises of the Grameen Family of Enterprises. These organisations include Grameen Trust, Grameen Fund, Grameen Communications, Grameen Shakti (Grameen Energy), Grameen Telecom, Grameen Shikkha (Grameen Education), Grameen Motsho (Grameen Fisheries), Grameen Baybosa Bikash (Grameen Business Development), Grameen Phone, Grameen Software Limited, Grameen CyberNet Limited, Grameen Knitwear Limited, and Grameen Uddog (owner of the brand Grameen Check).

On 11 July 2005 the Grameen Mutual Fund One (GMFO), approved by the Securities and Exchange Commission of Bangladesh, was listed as an initial public offering.  One of the first mutual funds of its kind, GMFO will allow the more than four million Grameen bank members, as well as non-members, to buy into Bangladesh's capital markets. The Bank and its constituents are together worth over US$7.4 billion.

The Grameen Foundation was developed to share the Grameen philosophy and expand the benefits of microfinance for the world's poorest people. Grameen Foundation, which has an A-rating from [Charity Watch], provides microloans in the USA (the only developed country where this is done), and supports microfinance institutions worldwide with loan guarantees, training, and technology transfer. As of 2008, Grameen Foundation supports microfinance institutions in the following regions:
 Asia-Pacific: Bangladesh, China, East Timor, Indonesia, India, Lebanon, Pakistan, Philippines, Saudi Arabia, Yemen
 Americas: Bolivia, Dominican Republic, El Salvador, Haiti, Honduras, Mexico, Peru, United States
 Africa: Cameroon, Egypt, Ethiopia, Ghana, Morocco, Nigeria, Rwanda, Tunisia, Uganda

From 2005, Grameen Bank worked on Mifos X, an open source technology framework for core banking solutions. Since 2011, Grameen Bank released this technology under the stewardship of Mifos Initiative, a US Non Profit organisation.

Criticism 
Some analysts have suggested that microcredit can bring communities into debt from which they cannot escape. Researchers have noted instances when microloans from the Grameen Bank were linked to exploitation and pressures on poor families to sell their belongings, leading in extreme cases to humiliation and ultimately suicides.

The Mises Institute's Jeffrey Tucker suggests that microcredit banks depend on subsidies to operate, thus acting as another example of welfare. Yunus believes that he is working against the subsidised economy, giving borrowers the opportunity to create businesses. Some of Tucker's criticism is based on his interpretation of Grameen's "16 decisions", seen as indoctrination, without considering what they mean in the context of poor, illiterate peasants.

The Norwegian documentary Caught in Micro Debt claims that Grameen evaded taxes. The Spanish documentary Microcredit also suggested this. The accusation is based on the unauthorised transfer of approximately US$100 million, donated by The Norwegian Agency for Development Cooperation (Norad), from one Grameen entity to another in 1996, before the expiry of the Grameen Bank's tax exemption. However, Norad published a statement in December 2010 clearing Yunus and the Bank of any wrongdoing on this point, following a comprehensive review of Norad's support commissioned by the Minister of International Development.

Yunus denies that this is tax evasion:

David Roodman and Jonathan Morduch question the statistical validity of studies of microcredit's effects on poverty, noting the complexity of the situations involved. Yoolim Lee and Ruth David discuss how microfinance and the Grameen model in South India have in recent years been distorted by venture capitalism and profit-makers. In some cases, poor rural families have suffered debt spirals, harassment by microfinance debt collectors, and in some cases suicide.

Representation in other media
 The film To Catch a Dollar (2010) documents the process of establishing Grameen America programs in Queens, New York in 2008. It premiered at the 2010 Sundance Film Festival.
 The documentary film Living on One Dollar (2010) includes Grameen Bank providing microcredit to start small home businesses in a rural Guatemalan village. The documentary is available directly from the organisation "Living on One" , and on Netflix .

See also 

 Accion International
 Acción Emprendedora
 Accion USA
 Cooperative banking
 Count Me In
 Flat rate (finance)
 Grama Vidiyal, Indian Microfinance Bank
 Islamic banking
 Kiva
 Micro credit for water supply and sanitation
 Microgrant
 Opportunity International
 Project Enterprise

Notes

References

Further reading 

 
 
 "Micro Loans for the Very Poor", The New York Times, 16 February 1997

External links 
   Grameen.com: official Grameen Bank website
   Grameen Bank old website
 GramBangla.com: Australian Bangladeshi Community Grameen Support Group
 Grameen Bank: Taking Capitalism to the Poor, Mainsah, E. et al., Chazen Journal of International Business, Columbia Business School, 2004
  Video by Muhammad Yunus talking about Grameen Bank
 
 Grameen Bank History
 The crushing burden of microcredit F24 international report
 Grameen America – Grameen's microfinance operations in the US
  with the prize motivation

Banks of Bangladesh
Cooperative banking in Asia
Microfinance companies of Asia
Microfinance banks
Rural community development
Bangladeshi Nobel laureates
Organizations awarded Nobel Peace Prizes
Development innovation in Bangladesh
Recipients of the Gandhi Peace Prize
Recipients of the Independence Day Award
Companies based in Dhaka
Organisations based in Motijheel
Banks established in 1983
Bangladeshi companies established in 1983
Cooperatives in Bangladesh